The Nitra (Slovak: Nitra) is a river in western Slovakia. It flows into the Váh river in Komoča. Its source is in the Malá Fatra (Lesser Fatra) mountains north of Prievidza. The river Nitra passes through the towns of Bojnice, Topoľčany, Nitra and Nové Zámky. The old branch of the Nitra, Stará Nitra, branches off near Nové Zámky and flows into the Váh close to its confluence with the Danube in Komárno.

References

Rivers of Slovakia